The Radiological Society of North America (RSNA) is a non-profit organization and an international society of radiologists, medical physicists and other medical imaging professionals representing 31 radiologic subspecialties from 145 countries around the world. Based in Oak Brook, Illinois, it was established in 1915. RSNA's organizational mission is to promote excellence in patient care and health care delivery through education, research and technologic innovation.

The Society hosts an annual conference in Chicago and develops educational resources such as courses, workshops and webinars. RSNA also publishes five peer-reviewed radiology journals, offers quality improvement tools, sponsors research to advance quantitative imaging biomarkers, and conducts outreach to enhance radiology education and patient care in low-income and middle-income countries.

RSNA Annual Meeting 
RSNA hosts the world's largest annual medical imaging conference, a five-day event starting the last Sunday of November at the McCormick Place convention center in Chicago.

RSNA Journals 
RSNA publishes five peer-reviewed journals: Radiology, offering radiology research and reviews; RadioGraphics, dedicated to continuing education in radiology; Radiology: Artificial Intelligence, highlights the emerging applications of machine learning and artificial intelligence in the field of imaging across multiple disciplines; Radiology: Cardiothoracic Imaging, emphasizes research advances and technical developments in medical imaging that drive cardiothoracic medicine; Radiology: Imaging Cancer, covers the best clinical and translational cancer imaging studies across organ systems and modalities, including leading-edge technological developments.

The RSNA journals are supported by a strong social media presence on Facebook, Twitter and Instagram.

RSNA Case Collection 
RSNA Case Collection is an online resource of clinical cases intended to be used as an education and point-of-care tool. Developed by and created for radiologists, RSNA Case Collection includes image-focused case reports from across radiology subspecialties, and consists of images, relevant patient information, final and differential diagnoses, case discussions and references. All cases will undergo careful peer review before they are assigned a DOI - allowing them to be fully citable.

RSNA's Case Collection is supported by an active Twitter presence.

RSNA Imaging AI Certificate Program 
The RSNA Imaging AI Certificate program is a radiology-specific imaging AI certificate program that combines a case-based curriculum and on-demand learning with practical application.

The program is for radiologists, radiology residents, physicists, data scientists and clinical researchers seeking foundational-level AI knowledge who want to learn how to safely evaluate, implement, use and monitor performance of AI-based tools for medical imaging.

The Foundational Certificate course is the only course currently available within the program and the curriculum includes six modules. More advanced certificate courses will be available in the future.

RSNA Courses, Workshops and Webinars 
RSNA works with global radiology experts to develop courses on essential topics in medical imaging. These "Spotlight Courses" are held in various locations around the world and the course programs are often in the region's native language.

RSNA offers a variety of in-depth workshops in grant writing, research development and academic radiology. 

Periodically, RSNA offers webinars on timely topics in the field of radiology.

RadiologyInfo.org 
Available in English and Spanish, RadiologyInfo.org is the public information website developed and funded by the Radiological Society of North America (RSNA) and the American College of Radiology (ACR). It was established to inform and educate the general public about what radiology is and what radiologists do. Approximately half a million people visit RadiologyInfo.org each month.

RadiologyInfo.org is supported by an active social media presence on Twitter and Facebook.

RSNA News 
RSNA News is a source of radiology news, research and RSNA updates. Trusted as global resource, the print issue complements the online News website and is supported by a robust social media presence on Facebook, Twitter, LinkedIn and Instagram.

RSNA Career Connect 
RSNA Career Connect helps radiologists search for jobs and fellowships. Employers can also use Career Connect to post available radiology jobs and fellowships.

RSNA R&E Foundation 
The RSNA R&E Foundation supports radiology research through grant funding, training opportunities and industry initiatives that advance innovation in radiology. The Foundation has awarded $70 million in grants since 1984.

RSNA Board of Directors 
RSNA’s Board of Directors is a highly skilled and carefully selected group of individuals committed to improving the future of radiology and advancing the Society’s mission. The current president is Bruce G. Haffty, MD.

References

External links 
  Official website

Medical associations based in the United States
Radiology organizations
Medical and health professional associations in Chicago